Belgium is a village in Vermilion County, Illinois, United States. It is part of the Danville, Illinois Metropolitan Statistical Area. The population was 404 at the 2010 census.

Geography 

Demographics 

As of the census of 2000, there were 466 people, 185 households, and 113 families residing in the village. The racial makeup of the village was 98.50% White, 0.21% Native American, 0.86% from other races, and 0.43% from two or more races. Hispanic or Latino of any race were 2.36% of the population.

There were 185 households, out of which 33.0% had children under the age of 18 living with them, 45.9% were married couples living together, 10.3% had a female householder with no husband present, and 38.4% were non-families. 33.0% of all households were made up of individuals, and 11.4% had someone living alone who was 65 years of age or older. The average household size was 2.52 and the average family size was 3.21.

In the village, the population was spread out, with 28.8% under the age of 18, 7.5% from 18 to 24, 31.3% from 25 to 44, 20.4% from 45 to 64, and 12.0% who were 65 years of age or older. The median age was 34 years. For every 100 females, there were 92.6 males. For every 100 females age 18 and over, there were 102.4 males.

The median income for a household in the village was $32,500, and the median income for a family was $35,357. Males had a median income of $30,096 versus $22,708 for females. The per capita income for the village was $16,038. About 13.0% of families and 13.1% of the population were below the poverty line, including 13.2% of those under age 18 and 21.2% of those age 65 or over.

References 

Villages in Vermilion County, Illinois
Villages in Illinois